Consett was a railway station built by the North Eastern Railway on the route of the Stanhope and Tyne Railway, in County Durham, North East England. It served the industrial town of Consett, which was best known for its steelworks.

History
Opened on 17 August 1896 by the North Eastern Railway, it became part of the London and North Eastern Railway during the Grouping of 1923. The station then passed on to the North Eastern Region of British Railways on nationalisation in 1948.

This lasted only five years however, the LVR was extended northwards to Newcastle via  &  and a new station was opened at Benfieldside on the northern edge of the town. This was renamed "Consett" in 1882 and again to "Consett & Blackhill" (as it was closer to the latter community) in 1885, before eventually becoming Blackhill when the 1896 depot opened. This station was located on the former S&T route east of the intersection with the Durham - Blackhill - Scotswood line and opened on the same day that passenger trains began running to Newcastle via  and a junction with the East Coast Main Line near Birtley (a chord line having been built by the NER to link the main line with the S&T route where they crossed each other). Travellers from the new station could also use the Derwent Valley line via Blackhill to reach Newcastle by means of a link line between the two routes that had been commissioned in 1893 - this alternative route was actually a couple of miles shorter but had a less frequent service. Facilities were quite basic, with wooden buildings in the middle of the island platform linked via a sloping path to the road overbridge at the eastern end.

Passenger services on the Derwent Valley line via Lintz Green were withdrawn by the British Transport Commission north of Blackhill on 1 February 1954 and those on the line from Ouston Junction to Blackhill followed on 23 May 1955, with the station closing to passenger traffic on that date. Goods traffic continued to be handled at the station until 2 October 1967, the line from Blackhill having closed to all traffic four years previously.

The ex-S&T line through the station latterly remained in use to serve the nearby steelworks until they closed in September 1980 and then subsequently for the demolition trains used to clear the site.  The last passenger train (a railtour special) called on 17 March 1984 and the line closed completely shortly afterwards, despite calls to reinstate passenger services from Newcastle to serve the town and the Beamish Museum.  The tracks were lifted later that year and the station demolished.

Present and Future
The site of the station and the lines on approach to it were lost when the A692 road was realigned, following the dismantling of the railway through it.

However, in June 2020, MP for North West Durham, Richard Holden, sponsored a bid to the Ideas Fund of the Department for Transport's Restoring Your Railway Fund, hoping to access up to £50,000 to cover the cost of an initial study into the feasibility of restoring a rail link between Consett and Blaydon.

References 
 
 
 
 Station on navigable O.S. map

Notes

External links
Consett @ Disused stations

Disused railway stations in County Durham
Railway stations in Great Britain opened in 1896
Railway stations in Great Britain closed in 1955
Former North Eastern Railway (UK) stations
Consett